Timothy Moffett (born February 8, 1962) is a former American football wide receiver in the National Football League who played for the Los Angeles Raiders and San Diego Chargers. He played college football for the Ole Miss Rebels.

References

1962 births
Living people
American football wide receivers
San Diego Chargers players
Los Angeles Raiders players
Ole Miss Rebels football players
National Football League replacement players